Interstate 15 (I-15) is an Interstate Highway in the U.S. state of Nevada that begins in Primm, continues through Las Vegas and it crosses the border with Arizona in Mesquite. Within the state, the freeway runs entirely in Clark County. The highway was built along the corridor of the older U.S. Route 91 (US 91) and Arrowhead Trail, eventually replacing both of these roads.

The entire route of I-15 is designated the Las Vegas Freeway.

Route description

Motorists in California begin a long descent through Ivanpah Valley and Ivanpah Dry Lake. I-15 crosses the Nevada state line at the first exit, Primm. Once I-15 leaves Primm, the route travels north through the desert with few services. The highway then enters the Las Vegas urban area upon passing the State Route 146 (SR 146, Saint Rose Parkway) interchange.

From Silverado Ranch Boulevard to US 95, the freeway has HOV lanes that are currently enforced by both Metro and NHP, 24 hours a day and 7 days a week and is the only state within the nation to do so.

The Interstate meets I-215 at the Southern Beltway Interchange, which provides access to Henderson and Harry Reid International Airport. Originally, this interchange was termed Son of Spaghetti Bowl by the Las Vegas Review-Journal when it was built.

I-15 travels along the west side of the Las Vegas Strip corridor and just west of downtown Las Vegas just before its junction with I-515 and US 95 (the "Spaghetti Bowl" interchange). Then, the Interstate enters North Las Vegas and continues to run roughly parallel to Las Vegas Boulevard (old US 91) as it leaves the Las Vegas urban limits near the northern junction with the Clark County 215 beltway.

Once I-15 leaves North Las Vegas, the freeway travels northeast and crosses the Muddy River at Glendale and then climbs up onto the Mormon Mesa. At Mesquite, the freeway then crosses the Arizona state line and cuts through the extreme northwestern corner of Arizona through the Virgin River Gorge before entering Utah.

History

Early routes
The general location of the I-15 corridor through Nevada can be traced as far back as the early 1900s. Regular automobile travel through southern Nevada was established by 1914 along the Arrowhead Trail, a road connecting Los Angeles and Salt Lake City. In 1919, the Nevada Legislature amended its newly adopted highway law to add SR 6, which was described as "Commencing at the Arizona line near Mesquite and running southwesterly over what is now known as the Arrow Head [sic] trail through Las Vegas to Jean, Nevada." Two years later, the route was revised to pass through Las Vegas and head "via Jean or Goodsprings to a junction with the California state highway system."

US 91 was later proposed as part of the original 1925 U.S. Highway System plan. As originally proposed, US 91 would have followed SR 6 southwest from Mesquite to downtown Las Vegas, where it would then turn southeast along SR 5 to California via Searchlight. The revised 1926 plan had proposed US 91 follow SR 6 through Las Vegas and Jean to the California state line. Nevada's 1927 official highway map reflects the routing of the final 1926 plan; however, a few maps from the era indicate the original proposal.

US 91 / SR 6 began at Primm and followed the Los Angeles Highway toward Las Vegas. Within the city limits, it ran along Fifth Street (now Las Vegas Boulevard) through downtown and into North Las Vegas, where it departed from 5th at Main Street. Exiting the Las Vegas area to the northeast, US 91 became the Salt Lake Highway and then headed toward Apex and Glendale. The highway then curved east-northeast before following present-day SR 170 through Riverside and Bunkerville into Mesquite. US 91 was routed through that city on Mesquite Boulevard, Sandhill Boulevard and Fairview Avenue before crossing the Arizona state line.

The route eventually gained two other highway overlaps. US 466 was christened in 1934, and was routed concurrently along US 91 from California to downtown Las Vegas before heading southeast to Hoover Dam (the route was deleted in 1971). Also, in 1936, US 93 was extended from its 1932 southern terminus at Glendale, over US 91 to downtown Las Vegas on its way to Hoover Dam.

Interstate development

A new alignment of US 91 was completed in 1955. This bypassed both Bunkerville and Mesquite to the northwest, along what would become the future path of I-15. The original alignment through Bunkerville is now SR 170.

The passage of the Federal Aid Highway Act of 1956 quickly brought upgrades to the US 91 corridor. The first section of the newly designated I-15 opened by 1960. This stretch extended from the California state line to just north of Sloan. By 1967, I-15 had been constructed along the entire length of US 91 except through parts of Las Vegas and near Mesquite.

The final sections of I-15 to be completed were in North Las Vegas and near the Arizona state line. Both of these sections were completed in 1974. The US 91 designation, which had remained on its original alignment during the construction of the Interstate, was made redundant by the new freeway and was removed in 1974.

Between Las Vegas and the California state line, the Nevada Department of Transportation (NDOT) added call boxes at  intervals in the mid-2000s, for motorists with vehicle problems and without cell phone service. This was done as part of a larger project that expanded this portion of the freeway to three travel lanes in each direction to coordinate with a similar effort in California.

In August 2011, I-15 in southern Las Vegas was substantially expanded. This involved adding between 30 to 85% more capacity and involved the use of the Big Stan drill rig.

Future
Due to heavy traffic, there are plans by the California Department of Transportation (Caltrans) and NDOT to widen I-15 in both directions from both US 395 in Hesperia and I-40 in Barstow to I-215 in Enterprise.

In 2020, Brightline signed a 50-year lease for use of the I-15 right-of-way between Victor Valley and the Las Vegas Valley for use in their Brightline West high-speed rail service.

Exit list

See also

References

External links

 Interstate 15 in Nevada @ AARoads

 Nevada
15
Ivanpah Valley
Transportation in Clark County, Nevada
Transportation in the Las Vegas Valley